Barrovian (or Barrow dialect) is an accent and dialect of English found in Barrow-in-Furness and several parts of the town's wider borough in Cumbria, England, historically in the county of Lancashire. Although a member of the Cumbrian dialect, The Barrovian and south Cumbria accent has a lot in common with the dialect of northern Lancashire, particularly the Lancaster/Morecambe area.

Barrovian is also used as a demonym for inhabitants of Barrow.

Origins
Up until the mid-19th century Barrow was nothing but a cluster of small villages with the Cumbrian dialect prevailing throughout, huge growth however occurred between 1860 and 1880 spurred on by the introduction of the railway to the Furness peninsula and the rapidly expanding steel and jute works. Barrow also became a major shipbuilding centre in the early 20th century. From a few thousand to 70,000 residents in under half a century, the majority of these were immigrants to the town drawn by the burgeoning industries. Large influxes came from elsewhere in Lancashire, Ireland (especially the counties of Antrim and Tyrone) and Scotland, with existing shipbuilding regions such as the Clyde and Tyneside providing a significant percentage of migrants in the early to mid-20th century. During the 1890s, one in six of the local population had been born in Ireland or Scotland. Barrow became a melting pot of accents and dialects and although it remains primarily Cumbria/Lancashire-orientated has strong influences from a wide geographical area.

Numerous place names in Barrow are of Old Norse and Celtic origin. Although they have long been Anglicised, many have had their pronunciation skewed over time by the aforementioned immigrant groups. One notable example being the suburbs of Roose which was settled by Cornish tin miners and is now pronounced locally with a 'z' in place of the 's'. The name Furness is also pronounced to sound like 'furnace'.

Phonology

A 2005 study of the Barrovian dialect by the British Library found a number of traits common amongst the populace. Most of the observations made are similar to other Northern English dialects with the sound /ʌ/ (as in 'up' or 'mother') being pronounced /ʊ/ (as in 'good' or 'put').  Other observations made included frequent T-glottalization on last letters and frequent intervocalic and syllable initial T-glottaling. In Plain English this can be described as the letter 't' being dropped from the middle or end of words. Examples of this include the word 'cart' (/kɑrt/) being pronounced as 'car' (/kaːʔ/), with a Glottal stop after the letter 'r'. Alternatively the number 'twenty' (/twɛnti/) could be pronounced 'twen-y' (/twɛnʔi/). The same study also found frequent G-dropping, H-dropping and Th-fronting. Respective examples of these phonetics include: 'freezing, exciting, sleeping' being pronounced 'freezin, excitin, sleepin' (where G-dropping speakers pronounce the -ing syllable as [ɪn], while non-G-dropping speakers have /ɪŋ/); 'appy (/hæpi/), hour (/haʊ.wər/), have (/hæv)' being pronounced 'appy (/æpi/), our (/aʊə/), ave (/æv)' with removal of the front '/h/'; and 'through (/θru/), thought (/θɒːt), three (/θri/)' being pronounced as 'rough (/frɪu/), frought (/frɒːt/), free (/frɪi/)'.

Pronunciation of words ending with the sound 'ure' (/ˈu:r/) are another distinct indicator of the Barrovian dialect. Some words drop the /u:/ completely and convert the 're' (/r/) to 'er' (/ər/), Examples of this include the word 'brochure' being pronounced 'broch-er' (/ˈbroːʃə/), 'texture' as 'text-er' (/ˈtɛkstʃə/) and 'figure' as 'fig-er' (/ˈfɪgə/). Alternatively many words containing /ˈu:r/ are pronounced /u:.ər/ (e.g. in the Barrovian dialect 'moor' rhymes with 'truer'). Further examples being: 'cure' (/ˈkjʊər/) pronounced 'kyou-er' (/ˈkjɪuə/), 'tour' (/tʊər/) as 'too-er' (ˈtɪuə), 'mature' as 'ma-chou-er' (/ˈməˈtʃɪuə/) and 'secure' as 'sec-you-er' (/səkˈjɪuə/). There is no convention for which words drop the letter 'u' and which emphasise it, with little correlation between word length and pronunciation.

Phrases and lexis
The words 'dead' and 'well' are often used in conversation to mean 'very' or make a strong point, for example "it was well good", or "it was dead bad". The word 'like' is frequently used with little meaning, as is the term 'and that' which roughly translates to the use of the term 'etc.' in a spoken conversation. For example, "I bought some crisps and biscuits and that"

(a boughʔ sʊm crisps’n biscuits n’aʔ). 
The list below contains common words and daily greetings in Standard English (in bold) and their Barrovian equivalent (in italics), and examples of use in a sentence or phrase (in parentheses).

 I - a (a went out last night)
 Anything - aught/owt
 Barrow - Barra
 Clothes - clobber
 Drunk -  ratted, off your head (off yer’ead), recked
 Going on a trip or walk - going on a bod 
 Hello - iya
 Him/Her - im/er
 Here you go - eer yare
 How are you - Ow are ya (owar-y) or (y')oriʔe or oreeʔ
 Later - after
 Me - us (leave us alone)
 Moody - mardy
 Mother - mam
 Nothing - nowt
 Playing truant - jigging
 Saw - sin (I sin her yesterday in town)
 Something - summat
 Trousers - kecks, pants
 Unfair - tight
 Where are you? - where y'aʔ?
 Where are you going? - where y'off?
 We - us (us two)
 Up to no good - Shithouse
 You (plural) - Youse / yous referring to a group of people

Barrovian as a demonym
'Barrovian' is also used to refer to an individual hailing from Barrow. For some the term has become synonymous with local football team Barrow A.F.C. The term 'Old Barrovian' was used in the 20th century to refer to alumni of the Barrow Boy and Girl Grammar Schools, which through a complicated history has become Furness Academy.

Recognition
Outside of North West England, Barrovian is relatively unknown in comparison to more widespread dialects. A poll conducted by Travelodge in 2014 resulted in Barrovian being placed sixth 'least favourite' of regional accents in the UK behind Essex, Brummie, Cockney, Belfast and Highland respectively.

Notable speakers

See also
 List of dialects of the English language
 Northern England English
 Cumbrian dialect
 Lancashire dialect and accent
 Geordie
 Manchester dialect
 Scouse
 Scottish English
 Glasgow patter

References

Barrow-in-Furness
British English
English language in England